The Doctor Blake Mysteries (also The Blake Mysteries) is an Australian television series that premiered on ABC TV on 1 February 2013 at 8:30 pm. The series stars Craig McLachlan in the lead role of Dr. Lucien Blake, who returns home to Ballarat, northwest of Melbourne, in the late 1950s to take over his late father's general medical practice and role as police surgeon after an absence of 30 years. Five series aired as of 2017, with a telemovie to close the program at the completion of the fifth season.

In October 2017, the Seven Network announced they acquired production rights for 2018. Producers later announced production would be suspended pending outcome of the police investigation of the sexual assault allegations directed at McLachlan.

In April 2018, Seven Network announced a series of sequel telemovies including much of the Blake series cast except McLachlan. The sequel series was still to be called The Blake Mysteries despite the absence of the title character, who in the series chronology was said to be missing and presumed dead.

After a single telemovie, titled The Blake Mysteries: A New Beginning and aired on 30 November 2018, producers ruled out making any further telemovies in 2019.

Original broadcasts
The series is produced by Tony Wright and George Adams. A fifth series was commissioned as the final season of the programme, followed by a telemovie to end the series in 2017. It was anticipated that the fifth series would air from April 2017, but instead commenced in September, so that the movie-length finale could be shown at the close of the series with no gap.

Synopsis
Dr. Lucien Blake left Australia in his 20s to study medicine in Scotland. Following a posting at a London hospital, he joined the British Army as a medical officer. During World War II, Blake's service included the Far East, where he fell in love with and married a Chinese woman, and had a child. However, at the fall of Singapore, he lost sight of both of them. He searched for them all the time he was away, and continues the search after he arrives in Ballarat. Blake also spent time in Thailand's Ban Pong POW camp. After a 33-year absence, Blake returned home in 1959 to take over his late father's practice as a medical general practitioner and also becomes the Ballarat area police surgeon.

Jean Beazley is Blake's receptionist and housekeeper. Having previously served in the same capacity for his father, Beazley has difficulty adjusting to Blake's eccentric and sometimes oblivious behaviour; although considered old-fashioned in her ideas about womanhood, she occasionally challenges Blake's expectation that she wait on him hand and foot. Her husband died in the war and she is aware that her living with the unattached Blake is a source of gossip. Shrewd and observant, her maternal tendencies are often a source of annoyance to her nephew, Danny Parks, whom she treats like a son, and lodger Mattie O'Brien, whose outgoing attitude she does not understand at all. When Parks moves out, police sergeant Charlie Davis becomes a lodger in the house.

Cast
Craig McLachlan as Dr. Lucien Blake
Nadine Garner as Jean Beazley
Cate Wolfe as Matilda "Mattie" O'Brien (Series 1–4.2)
Joel Tobeck as Chief Superintendent (later Chief Inspector) Matthew Lawson (Series 1–4.1, 5)
Rick Donald as Constable (later Sergeant) Daniel Parks (Series 1, 5)
Sara Gleeson as Joy McDonald (Series 1–2.1)
Charlie Cousins as Constable (later Sergeant) Charlie Davis (Series 2–5)
Belinda McClory as Alice Harvey (Series 2–5)
John Wood as Patrick Tyneman (Series 1–5)
Craig Hall as Chief Supt William Munro (Series 3, 5)
John Stanton as Douglas Ashby (Series 1–3)
Neil Pigot as Major Derek Alderton (Series 1, 4)
David Whiteley as Sergeant Bill Hobart 
Ian Rooney as Cec Drury 
Lee Beckhurst as Edward Tyneman (Series 1–5)
Rodger Corser as Chief Supt Frank Carlyle (Series 4)
Anna McGahan as Rose Anderson (Series 4–5)
Ling-Hsueh Tang as Mei Lin Blake (Series 4)

Production
The Doctor Blake Mysteries is produced by Melbourne-based December Media in association with Film Victoria and ABC Television, which also broadcasts it in Australia on ABC. The international sales are handled by British ITV Studios Global Entertainment.

The series is set and mostly filmed in the gold rush city of Ballarat, in Victoria. It features Lydiard Street and many of the heritage buildings, including the Colonists Club, of which Blake is a member. External shots of the house and studio formerly owned by the muralist Napier Waller, in Melbourne, are used as a backdrop to represent Blake's house.

The fourth series began airing on 5 February 2016. In March 2017, it was announced that the programme would be ending, with a television-movie airing after season five. Filming of the fifth season began in August 2016, then recommenced in August 2017 for filming of the movie-length finale. The fifth series began airing on 17 September 2017.

Broadcast
It premiered in the United Kingdom on 25 November 2013 on BBC One. It is also shown by a number of other European TV channels and in New Zealand.  The series airs on selected Public Broadcasting Service (PBS) stations in the United States. For streaming video, Series 1-5 are all on BritBox in the US as of 2020. It was added to the schedule of the American network Ovation in the middle of 2022.

Episodes

Sequel
In October 2017, the Seven Network announced that they had acquired production rights for 2018. However, after the allegations against McLachlan, a sequel series, later titled The Blake Mysteries, was proposed by the Seven Network and supported by Screen Australia.

The series would open with a telemovie, similar in length to the finale that closed the five seasons of The Doctor Blake Mysteries.  With McLachlan defending sexual harassment charges during 2019, he and his character would be written out of the sequel, which (in the internal chronology of the series) would begin three years after the end of the previous series finale.  Most of the rest of the cast would return for the new series, with Blake disappearing in mysterious circumstances, and his new bride Beazley to take on a more central role.

The series of four telemovies was subsequently reduced to a single telemovie, titled The Blake Mysteries: A New Beginning, which aired on 30 November 2018. It featured Garner, Tobeck, McClory, Whiteley and Rooney returning to their roles alongside new cast Tom Wren as Martin Carver,  Emma Annand as Amy Parks and Joshua Orpin as Constable Peter Crowe. Seven ruled out further telemovies in 2019.

Awards and nominations

Home media

References

External links
 
 
 

2013 Australian television series debuts
APRA Award winners
Australian Broadcasting Corporation original programming
2010s Australian crime television series
Australian drama television series
Detective television series
English-language television shows
2010s mystery television series
Television series set in 1959
Television series set in 1960
Television shows set in Victoria (Australia)